Loreglia is a comune (municipality) in the Province of Verbano-Cusio-Ossola in the Italian region Piedmont, located about  northeast of Turin and about  southwest of Verbania.

Loreglia borders the following municipalities: Casale Corte Cerro, Germagno, Ornavasso, Quarna Sopra, Valstrona.

Demographic evolution

References

Cities and towns in Piedmont